Ménaka Airport  is an airport serving Ménaka, a town and commune in the Ménaka Cercle in the Gao Region of Mali.

References

 Great Circle Mapper - Ménaka
 Google Earth

Airports in Mali